This page details football records in Thailand.

Most successful teams

Top-performing clubs - league structures

Thai League 1

The Invincibles
Unbeatable champions:
 Muangthong United in 2012
 Buriram United in 2013
 Buriram United in 2015

Thai League 2

Thai League 3

Thai League 4

Provincial League

Futsal League

Top-performing clubs - cup competitions

Asian Club Championship and AFC Champions League

Thailand FA Cup

Thailand League Cup

Thailand Champions Cup (2017 - Present)

Kor Royal Cup - 1996-2016

Queen's Cup

Super Cup

National team top caps goalscorers

Thai League 1 records

All-time Thai League 1 table
The all-time Thai League 1 table is a cumulative record of all match results, points, and goals of every team that has played in the Thai League 1 since its inception in 1996. The table that follows is accurate as of the end of the 2021–22 season. Teams in bold are part of the 2022–23 Thai League 1.

League or status at 2021:

Notes

Asian Champions League

Participations

Q: Qualifying stage, GS: Group Stage, R16: Round of 16, QF: Quarterfinals, SF: Semifinal, RU: Runner-up, W: Winner

Asian Club Championship

Participations

A total of seven clubs represented Thailand in the AFC Asian Club Championship which became defunct in 2002 (see: AFC Champions League).

W: Winner

AFC Cup

Participations

Thai clubs history of playing in the AFC Cup, Osotsapa were the first side to take part since the competition started in 2004. After the revamping of the Champions League in 2009, Thai clubs once again entered.

G: Group round, Q: Quarterfinals, S: Semifinal, R: Runner-up, W: Winner

Asian Cup Winners Cup

Participations

The Asian Cup Winner Cup started in 1991, although Thai clubs did not enter until 1995. There was no Thai entrant in 1997. The competition became defunct in 2002. Thai clubs generally entered at the 2nd round.

2: 2nd round, Q: Quarterfinals, S: Semifinal, R: Runner-up, W: Winner

References

 The Football History Association of Thailand 
 Thai Premier League FAT

External links
 Football Association of Thailand 
 The Football History Association of Thailand 
 Thai Premier League FIFA
 Thailand - List of Champions RSSSF
 Thai football blog
 ผลบอลสด บ้านผลบอล ผลบอลวันนี้ 7m 888 Livescore

Football in Thailand
records and statistics
Association football records and statistics by country
Football
All-time football league tables